Andreína del Carmen Prieto Rincón is a Venezuelan model and beauty pageant titleholder. She was the official representative of Venezuela to the Miss World 2001 pageant held in Sun City, South Africa on November 16, 2001.

References

External links
Miss Venezuela Official Website
Miss World Official Website

1982 births
Living people
People from Maracaibo
Miss Venezuela World winners
Miss World 2001 delegates